Daryl Burgess (born 24 January 1971 in Birmingham) is an English footballer who played for West Bromwich Albion, Northampton Town, AFC Rochdale, Kidderminster Harriers, Nuneaton Borough and Bromsgrove Rovers F.C., where he was also assistant manager.

Burgess began his career at West Bromwich Albion, where he made his debut during the 1989–90 season. He spent 14 years at WBA, and played nearly 400 first-team games for the Baggies, mostly as central defender or right-back. He was released by West Bromwich in 2001, and then joined Northampton Town.

In 2003, Burgess joined Rochdale on a free transfer. After two seasons at Rochdale, he moved back to the West Midlands to join Kidderminster Harriers of the Conference. He left Kidderminster at the end of the 2005–06 season and signed for Nuneaton Borough, and later joined Bromsgrove in January 2008.

In a 21-year playing career (1987–2008) Burgess amassed a grand total of 507 senior appearances for his 3 football league clubs plus another 50 for Kidderminster and he also played in 120 reserve and intermediate games for WBA.

In 2008, Burgess started his own soccer school 'Total Football Premier Coaching'  with his ex WBA teammate Richard Sneekes and also DJs at various venues around the country.

He is currently still living in Birmingham with his wife Catrina, daughters Olivia and Alannah.

References

External links

Bromsgrove Rovers statistics

1971 births
Living people
English footballers
West Bromwich Albion F.C. players
Northampton Town F.C. players
Rochdale A.F.C. players
Kidderminster Harriers F.C. players
Nuneaton Borough F.C. players
Bromsgrove Rovers F.C. players
Association football defenders